Wang Yu-yun (22 March 1925 – 17 August 2009) was a Taiwanese politician. He was the Mayor of Kaohsiung City in 1973–1981.

Early life
Wang obtained his education from the police academy.

Early career
After graduation, Wang opened up his business in ship breaking and steel industries.

Prosecution
Wang was indicted in April 2000 and was barred from leaving Taiwan starting in 2002. In April 2007, he was sentenced to prison after he was found guilty in misusing the funds of Chung Shing Commercial Bank for more than NT$80 billion. He failed to report for his jail term, which was to begin on 15 September 2007. Subsequently, he was placed on the wanted list. He was suspected to have fled to Mainland China and had transferred most of his wealth to the mainland and other countries.

Death
Wang died on 17 August 2009 in Hangzhou, Zhejiang after a long illness.

References

Mayors of Kaohsiung
1925 births
2009 deaths
Kuomintang politicians in Taiwan
Taiwanese politicians convicted of crimes
Taiwanese expatriates in China
20th-century Taiwanese politicians